Knittkuhl is an urban quarter (Stadtteil) of Düsseldorf, part of Borough 7. It shares borders with the Düsseldorf quarters Rath, Ludenberg and Hubbelrath, and with the town Ratingen. The Stadtteil was established in 2014, when it was separated from Hubbelrath.

References

Urban districts and boroughs of Düsseldorf